is a railway station in Minamata, Kumamoto, Japan, operated by Kyushu Railway Company (JR Kyushu). The station building was designed by Makoto Sei Watanabe and opened on 13 March 2004.

Lines 
Kyushu Railway Company
Kyūshū Shinkansen
Hisatsu Orange Railway
Hisatsu Orange Railway Line

Platforms

JR Kyushu

Hisatsu Orange Railway 
The Hisatsu Orange Railway serves one island platform at Shin-Minamata. This station is unmanned.

Adjacent stations

History
19 September 1968: The site opened as JNR Hatsuno S.B.
1 April 1987: Hatuno S.B. was inherited by JR Kyushu.
13 March 2004: The Kyushu Shinkansen Shin-Minamata Station was opened. The JR Kyushu Kagoshima Main Line was transferred to the control of the Hisatsu Orange Railway, and Hatsuno S.B. became Shin-Minamata Station.

External links

JR Kyushu station information
Kumamoto pref. Station information
Design concept description

Railway stations in Kumamoto Prefecture
Railway stations in Japan opened in 2004
Stations of Hisatsu Orange Railway